An accounting network or accounting association is a professional services network whose principal purpose is to provide members resources to assist the clients around the world and hence reduce the uncertainty by bringing together a greater number of resources to work on a problem. The networks and associations operate independently of the independent members. The largest accounting networks are known as the Big Four.

The Big Four

History of accounting networks and associations

Foundations 

Accounting networks were created to meet a specific need. “The accounting profession in the U.S. was built upon a state-established monopoly for audits of financial statements.” Accounting networks arose out of the necessity for public American companies to have audited financial statements for the Securities and Exchange Commission (SEC).  For over 70 years, the SEC has continually sought for greater coordination and consistent quality in audits everywhere in the world. Networks were the logical model to address these requirements.  They expanded outside of the United States since financial results had to be audited wherever a company conducted business. In the US, the Public Company Accounting Oversight Board's (PCAOB) regulations provide for inspection of non-United States firms. Without a network with common standards and internal means of communications, conducting the required audits would not be possible.

There were other profession-based factors which favored the growth of accounting networks. As a result of competition for the audit work, consolidation was inevitable. These include the fact that a network can establish a brand. A brand establishes the credibility of the network and allows the individual members to charge more. Creating a brand is very difficult when all of the members of a network are providing essentially the same services.

Being a network member establishes that the firm is part of a large group. Additionally, the larger the firm, the more likely it will be invited to render auditing engagements.  A large organized network allows for spreading the costs to price competitively. Ultimately, size is the only real means of differentiation that is readily available on accounting firms to assure clients that they can do international work.

Networks also reflect the clients’ needs for seamless worldwide services because they are more efficient and cost-effective. From the perspective of the accounting firm, a global regulated organization with consistently applied standards significantly reduced the risk. However, increasing the size of the networks can enhance legal liability risks and quality control issues that have not been resolved.

With these factors in play, some networks continued to grow; others remained in a stasis position. Individual members of networks began to offer other services related to accounting. These services included forensic accounting, business appraisals, employee benefits planning, strategic planning, and almost anything associated with financial parts of the client’s business. The network’s structure easily accommodated these services and their geographical expansion.

As the Big Eight consolidated to become Big Six, the Big Five and then the Big Four, new networks naturally developed to emulate them. BDO and Grant Thornton were the earliest followers. Networks were then developed to serve mid-market companies and private businesses. New networks also sprang up as an extension of a single accounting firm in the same way the Big Eight were formed. New structures were created to further extend the networks.

The largest accounting networks adopted trade names that each member used. The names of the original firms that became part of the networks were lost and replaced with trade names. The perception was created that these networks were more than networks, but single entities rather than completely independent firms. This was never the case. The result was that the Big Eight concept was established which separated the eight firms from all other accounting firms.

Another factor in the development of networks in accounting was the American Institute of Certified Public Accountants (AICPA)’s prohibition of advertising. While the largest firms indirectly advertised their services, the small firms complied with the rules and believed advertising to be unprofessional. Additionally, midsize firms were de facto restricted from advertising simply because of limited budgets. They could not create a brand that was able to compete with the one established by the Big Eight. The advertising restriction was lifted in the 1970s by the Federal Trade Commission.

Multidisciplinary expansion 

In the 1990s, the large accounting firms reached another ceiling in the services they made available to their clients. Having reached their natural limit on growth with more than 90% of auditing for public companies, the Big 6 branched out to become multidisciplinary in legal, technology, and employment services. Since the essential infrastructure was in place, it was thought to be relatively simple to incorporate other services into the existing network. As a network, it was natural to create independent entities in these other professions which themselves could be part of the network. The method and structures varied from firm to firm.

When the Big 6 began its expansion to the legal profession, it was met with fierce opposition from law firms and bar associations. Commissions, panels and committees were established by legal and accounting firms to argue their positions. Government agencies were enlisted. For more than five years the debate escalated.  This movement ended abruptly with the fall of Arthur Andersen as a result of its association with Enron. Sarbanes Oxley followed, which effectively ended this trend. Some international associations of independent firms, such as Alliott Group, now include law firms within the membership.

Global ranking 

Here is the list of the 10 largest global accounting networks based on full year 2021 revenue:

Vicarious liability 

Accounting networks are now facing a new challenge that go to the heart of the image that the firms wish to project to clients. The perception has been that the Big Four, Grant Thornton and BDO are single entities that perform services around the world for clients of this single entity. As a result of court cases this has introduced significant vicarious liability issues requiring the networks to distance themselves from the perception of being a single entity. The Parmalat case is the best illustration of the issues.

While the firms have lost a number of cases, the facts and circumstance, or procedural elements have reduced their actual liability.

Networks versus associations 

The vicarious liability issues carry over into operations. Regulations in the EU have been imposed that require the “networks” to define whether they are "associations" of independent firm or are more integrated networks operationally and financially. Additional standards have been passed by the International Federation of Accountants, an independent organization representing the accounting industry, on distinguishing networks from associations.  The objectives of each are to provide the clients a level of understanding about the degree of integration with each other.  Examples of international associations of accounting firms include Alliott Group, Geneva Group International and Leading Edge Alliance.

Here is the list of top 10 global accounting associations in 2021: 

Global Accountancy Associations Top 10

Conflicts of interest 

Self-definition as a network or associations may determine if there is a  conflict of interest.  If the group is perceived as a network, it may be foreclosed from representation of clients because they cannot represent a competitor. Association members would not be foreclosed from representation because the firms are perceived as independent by clients.

Big 4 dominance of public company audits 

Accounting scandals have again focused on the fact that the Big Four has a near monopoly on audits of public companies.  Networks are demanding regulations on auditing to require that auditors rotate and include the smaller networks in this rotation. The demands also request that mid-market firms be able to participate to break up the monopoly of the Big Four.

List of accounting networks and associations 

 Andersen Global
 Alliott Group
 Baker Tilly
 BDO International (Binder Dijker Otte & Co)
 Crowe Global
 Deloitte (Deloitte Haskins Sells/Deloitte, Haskins Sells, Touche Ross, Tohmatsu)
 Ernst & Young (Arthur Young, Ernst Whinney/Ernst Ernst, Whinney Smith Murray)
 Grant Thornton International
 HLB International
 KPMG (Klynveld Main Goerdeler, Peat Marwick)
 Mazars
 MNP LLP
 Morison KSi
 Moore Global
 PKF International
 PwC (PricewaterhouseCoopers) (Coopers & Lybrand/Cooper Brothers, Lybrand Ross Brothers Montgomery, Price Waterhouse)
 RSM International
 SMS Latinoamerica

See also
 Umbrella organization
 Business networking
 Organization studies
 Multidisciplinary professional services networks
 Law firm network
 Big Four accounting firms

References

International business organizations
Professional networks